The Peekaboo Galaxy (officially known as HIPASS J1131-31 and PGC 5060432) is an irregular compact blue (suggesting hot young stars) dwarf galaxy in the constellation Hydra. The galaxy is relatively small, at about 1,200 light-years (0.37 Mpc) across; and nearby, at a distance of about 22 million light-years (6.8 Mpc) from Earth. The Peekaboo Galaxy is considered one of the most metal-poor ("extremely metal-poor" (XMP)), least chemically enriched, and seemingly primordial, galaxies known.

Discovery 
Discovery of the Peekaboo Galaxy, hiding behind a relatively fast-moving foreground star, named TYC 7215-199-1, became apparent when, in the past 50 to 100 years, the star moved aside, clearing the view to the obscured galaxy. Hence, the related "Peekaboo" naming of the galaxy.

Detailed studies of the galaxy were reported in November 2022, and were based on work using the Hubble Space Telescope. The astronomers were able to closely examine about 60 of the individual stars in the galaxy, all appearing relatively young, a few billion years old or younger. In the words of Bärbel Koribalski, astronomer at CSIRO in Australia, original discoverer of the galaxy over 20 years ago in 2001, and coauthor of the recent study of the galaxy, "At first we did not realize how special this little galaxy is ... Now with combined data from the Hubble Space Telescope, the Southern African Large Telescope (SALT), and others, we know that the Peekaboo Galaxy is one of the most metal-poor galaxies ever detected." 

According to current thinking, early in the formation of the universe, 13.8 billion years ago, the earliest first stars were made, and were mostly composed of hydrogen and helium. Later, these very early stars fused their hydrogen and helium into heavier elements, up to, and including, iron. Heavier elements, beyond iron, were later produced as a result of violent supernova explosions, scattering these newly formed heavier elements throughout the Universe, where they would be incorporated into the formation of newer stars. The detection of the relatively close extremely metal-poor Peekaboo Galaxy ("extreme properties of a young system") may help astronomers better understand the formation of the very earliest stars and galaxies. 

According to astronomer Gagandeep Anand of the Space Telescope Science Institute, and coauthor of the recently published studies, "Uncovering the Peekaboo Galaxy is like discovering a direct window into the past, allowing us to study its extreme environment and stars at a level of detail that is inaccessible in the distant, early universe ... Due to Peekaboo’s proximity to us, we can conduct detailed observations, opening up possibilities of seeing an environment resembling the early universe in unprecedented detail.”

Future studies 
The astronomers also posed a concern that may have to await further studies of the Peekaboo Galaxy for clarification: “The situation with Peekaboo is decidedly ambiguous ... How can it have such low metallicity when 13 billion years have passed in the Local Universe?"

Future further studies of the galaxy with the Hubble Space Telescope and the James Webb Space Telescope are being considered.

See also 

 Galaxy formation and evolution
 I Zwicky 18
 List of galaxies
 Metallicity distribution function
 Metallicity#Galaxies
 Stellar classification
 Stellar evolution
 Stellar population

References

External links 
 Peekaboo Galaxy (video; 2:51) (NASA Space News; 12 December 2022)

?
Dwarf galaxies
Local Group
Milky Way Subgroup